Robert Collier (April 19, 1885 in St. Louis, Missouri – January 9, 1950) was an American author of self-help and New Thought metaphysical books in the 20th century. He was the nephew of Peter Fenelon Collier, founder of Collier's Weekly. He was involved in writing, editing, and research for most of his life.  His book The Secret of the Ages (1926) sold over 300,000 copies during his life.  Collier wrote about the practical psychology of abundance, desire, faith, visualization, confident action, and personal development.

Robert Collier Publications, Inc. still exists through the efforts of his widow, and now his children, grandchildren, and great-grandchildren. Collier's books, which have been popular with self-help and New Thought groups, have been brought back to prominence from being referenced in the popular metaphysical movie The Secret. In the book The Secret Rhonda Byrne writes: "The glimpse came in a hundred-year-old book, given to me by my daughter Hayley".

Mind, Inc. 
Starting in May 1929, Collier's organization published a monthly magazine called Mind, Inc.  The magazine was initially about half fiction, with much of the material religious in nature.  By 1932 almost all the fiction had disappeared.  The title changed to Mind Magazine with the May 1932.  It continued to appear until at least 1939.

The Robert Collier Letter Book 

The Robert Collier Letter Book is a collection of letters and copywriting techniques written by self-help author and publisher Robert Collier in the early 20th century. The book is considered a classic in the field of direct-response marketing and copywriting, and is still used as a reference by many modern marketers and copywriters.

Robert Collier began his career in advertising, working as a copywriter for several companies before eventually starting his own advertising agency. He became known for his successful direct-response advertising campaigns, which often utilized persuasive letter-writing techniques.

The Robert Collier Letter Book, first published in 1931 by the McGraw-Hill book company, is a compilation of some of Collier's most effective letters and copywriting techniques. The book includes letters for a variety of purposes, such as sales letters, fundraising letters, and letters to build relationships with customers. Collier's writing style is conversational and persuasive, and he emphasizes the importance of understanding the reader's needs and desires in order to effectively communicate with them.

The Robert Collier Letter Book has been widely used and referenced by copywriters, marketers, and business owners for decades. The book is considered a classic in the field of direct-response marketing and copywriting, and its teachings are still considered relevant today. It is a must-read for anyone interested in the art of persuasive writing and direct-response marketing.

Selected books written by Collier 
 Copywriting & Direct Marketing
 The Robert Collier Letter Book (1931)
 How To Make Money At Home In Spare Time By Mail
 The God in You
 The Magic Word
 The Secret of the Ages (1926)
 The Secret Power
 Riches Within Your Reach: The Law of the Higher Potential
 Be Rich! The Science of Getting What You Want
 The Book of Life (Volumes 1-7) 1925

Quotes 
 "You must intensify and render continuous by repeatedly presenting with suggestive ideas and mental pictures of the feast of good things, and the flowing fountain, which awaits the successful achievement or attainment of the desires."
 "The first principle of success is desire--knowing what you want. Desire is the planting of your seed.  Very few persons, comparatively, know how to Desire with sufficient intensity. They do not know what it is to feel and manifest that intense, eager, longing, craving, insistent, demanding, ravenous Desire which is akin to the persistent, insistent, ardent, overwhelming desire of the drowning man for a breath of air; of the shipwrecked or desert-lost man for a drink of water; of the famished man for bread and meat… "
" Success is the sum of small efforts, repeated day in and day out."

References

Sources

External links 
 Robert Collier Publications – with list of books by Collier
 

1885 births
1950 deaths
American spiritual teachers
American spiritual writers
New Thought writers